Anglo-Celtic Australians is an ancestral grouping of Australians whose ancestors originate wholly or partially in the British Isles - predominantly in England, Ireland, Scotland and Wales. 

While Anglo-Celtic Australians do not form an official ethnic grouping in the Australian Bureau of Statistics' Australian Standard Classification of Cultural and Ethnic Groups, due to the long historical dominance and intermixture of Australians with ancestries from the British Isles, it is commonly used as an informal ethnic identifier.

The term has received criticism for erasing historical distinctions between English and Celtic settlers. In particular, it does not account for the political and social segregation of English and Irish Australians which some scholars have labeled an apartheid or the fact that while many English arrived in Australia as willing immigrants, many Irish were forcibly transported as prisoners or refugees.

At the 2021 census, the number of ancestry responses from the following groups as a proportion of the total Australian population amounted to 51.7%: English Australian, Irish Australian, Scottish Australian, Welsh Australian, British Australian (so described), Manx Australian, Channel Islander Australian. The precise number of Anglo-Celtic Australians is unknown due to the way in which ancestry data is collected in Australia. For instance, many census recipients nominated two Anglo-Celtic ancestries due to the long history of these ancestries in Australia, tending towards an overcount. Conversely, the Australian Bureau of Statistics has stated that most people nominating "Australian" ancestry have at least partial Anglo-Celtic European ancestry despite "Australian" ancestry being classified as part of the Oceanian ancestry group, tending towards an undercount.

History

Pre-Federation 
The British Government initiated European settlement of the Australian continent by establishing a penal settlement at Sydney Cove in 1788. Between then and 1852, about 100,000 convicts (mostly tried in England) were transported to eastern Australia. Scotland and Wales contributed relatively few convicts.

Native-born Australians of British and Irish descent were approximately a quarter of the population of the colony of New South Wales in both 1817 and 1828. There were slightly more native-born than free settlers in 1850. They were nearly half of the population in 1868. Their proportion of the population decreased during the times of the rapid population growth brought on by the goldrushes. The convicts were augmented by free settlers, including large numbers who arrived during the gold-rush in the 1850s. As late as 1861, people born in England, Wales, Scotland and Ireland outnumbered even the Australia-born population. The number of settlers in Australia who were born in the United Kingdom (UK) peaked at 825,000 in 1891, from which point the proportion of British among all immigrants to Australia steadily declined.

Until 1859, 2.2 million (73%) of the free settlers who immigrated were British.

Post-Federation 
From the beginning of the colonial era until the mid-20th century, the vast majority of settlers to Australia were from Britain and Ireland, with the English being the dominant group, followed by the Irish and Scottish. Among the leading ancestries, increases in Australian, Irish, and German ancestries and decreases in English, Scottish, and Welsh ancestries appear to reflect such shifts in perception or reporting. These reporting shifts at least partly resulted from changes in the design of the census question, in particular the introduction of a tick box format in 2001.

Those born in the United Kingdom were the largest foreign group throughout the 20th century. Prior to the last quarter of the century, the United Kingdom was strongly favoured as a source country by immigrant selection policies and remained the largest single component of the annual immigration intake until 1995–96, when immigrants from New Zealand surpassed it in number.
However, their share of the total immigrant population is in decline. Those from the United Kingdom comprised 58 per cent of the total overseas-born population in 1901, compared to 27 per cent in 1996. An even greater decline has occurred for those born in Ireland. In 1901, those born in Ireland comprised 22 per cent of all immigrants, while in 1996 the Ireland-born
represented just 1 per cent of the immigrant population.

While those born in England have formed the largest component of the British immigrant population, Australia has also received significant numbers of immigrants from Ireland, Scotland, and Wales. Up until the First World War the Irish were, in their own right, the second largest immigrant population.

The most dramatic increase in the British immigrant population occurred between 1961 and 1971. The number of British-born people living in Australia exceeded one million at the 1971 Census and has remained above one million to this day. The United Kingdom-born population in Australia reached a peak of 1,107,119 in 1991.

Demographics

Anglo-Celtic is not an official ancestry category in the Australian census. Census respondents may nominate up to two ancestries. The number of ancestry responses from the following groups as a proportion of the total Australian population amounted to 51.7% at the 2021 census: English Australian, Irish Australian, Scottish Australian, Welsh Australian, British Australian (so described), Manx Australian, Channel Islander Australian. The precise number of Anglo-Celtic Australians is unknown due to the way in which ancestry data is collected in Australia. For instance, many census recipients nominated two Anglo-Celtic ancestries due to the long history of these ancestries in Australia, tending towards an overcount. Conversely, the Australian Bureau of Statistics has stated that most people nominating "Australian" ancestry have at least partial Anglo-Celtic European ancestry despite "Australian" ancestry being classified as part of the Oceanian ancestry group, tending towards an undercount.

At the 2021 census, the most commonly nominated Anglo-Celtic ancestries were:

The United Kingdom remains a significant source of immigrants to Australia. In 2005–06, 22,143 persons born in the United Kingdom settled in Australia, representing 21.4% of all migrants. At the 2006 Census (excluding overseas visitors) 1,038,165 persons identified themselves as having been born in the United Kingdom (5.2% of the Australian population), while 50,251 identified themselves as Irish born.

Tasmania could have the nation's highest proportion of citizens of Anglo-Celtic origin, possibly as high as 85 percent. On the evidence of statistics of ethnic derivation Tasmania could also be considered more British than New Zealand (where the Anglo-Celtic majority has fallen below 75 percent).

Historical demographics
Ancestry was first included as a question in the 1986 Census. The aim of the question was to measure the ethnic composition of the population as a whole. Very little use was made of the ancestry data from the 1986 Census. As a consequence, ancestry was not included in either the 1991 or 1996 Censuses. Between 1987 and 1999, the Anglo-Celtic component of Australia's population declined from 75 per cent to 70 per cent. In 1999, the Anglo-Celtic share of the Australian population was calculated as 69.9%.

The following table shows various Anglo-Celtic ancestries at various points in history.

The following table shows the British and Irish-born population as a proportion of the total population at various points in history.
 
Notes: From 1954 onwards people from "Northern Ireland" and "Ulster" were recorded separately from the people of "Ireland". The 1966 census (is Republic of Ireland & Ireland (undefined).

Maps

Controversy and criticism
Some have argued that the term is entirely a product of multiculturalism that ignores the history of sectarianism in Australia. For example, historian John Hirst wrote in 1994: "Mainstream Australian society was reduced to an ethnic group and given an ethnic name: Anglo-Celt."

According to Hirst:

In the eyes of multiculturalists, Australian society of the 1940s, 150 years after first settlement, is adequately described as Anglo-Celtic. At least this acknowledges that the people of Australia were Irish and Scots as well as English, but it has nothing more substantial than a hyphen joining them. In fact a distinct new culture had been formed. English, Scots and Irish had formed a common identity – first of all British and then gradually Australian as well. In the 1930s the historian W. K. Hancock could aptly describe them as Independent Australian Britons.

The Irish-Australian journalist Siobhán McHugh has argued that the term "Anglo-Celtic" is "an insidious distortion of our past and a galling denial of the struggle by an earlier minority group", Irish Australians, "against oppression and demonisation... In what we now cosily term "Anglo-Celtic" Australia, a virtual social apartheid existed at times between [Irish] Catholics and [British] Protestants", which did not end until the 1960s.

The term was also criticised by the historian Patrick O'Farrell as  "a grossly misleading, false, and patronising convenience, one crassly present-oriented. Its use removes from consciousness and recognition a major conflict fundamental to any comprehension not only of Australian history but of our present core culture."

Culture

Streams of migration from the United Kingdom and the Republic of Ireland to Australia played a key role in Australia's cultural development, despite the last substantial scheme for preferential migration from Britain to Australia ending in 1972.
There is a long history of cultural exchange between the countries and Australians often use Britain as a stepping-stone to international success.
In 1967, British migrants in Australia formed an association to represent their special interests: the United Kingdom Settlers' Association, which subsequently became the British Australian Community.

On 10 July 2017, a quote during a PM press conference at 10 Downing Street with Australian Prime Minister Malcolm Turnbull and UK Prime Minister Theresa May, Turnbull.

Also included in the speech:

Place names of British origin

There are many places in Australia named after people and places in the United Kingdom as a result of the many British settlers and explorers; in addition, some places were named after the British royal family.

New South Wales
New South Wales – Cook first named the land "New Wales", named after Wales. However, in the copy held by the Admiralty, he "revised the wording" to "New South Wales".

 Hyde Park – was named after the original Hyde Park in London, England and is the oldest public parkland in Australia
 Newcastle, New South Wales – is named after Newcastle, England
 The state capital city of Sydney is named in honour of English politician Thomas Townshend, 1st Viscount Sydney.

Northern Territory
 The state capital city of Darwin. A Scottish naval officer named the region "Port Darwin" in honour of English naturalist Charles Darwin.

Queensland
Queensland – The state was named in honour of Queen Victoria, who on 6 June 1859 signed Letters Patent separating the colony from New South Wales.
Brisbane – is named after Scotsman Thomas Brisbane.

South Australia
 The state capital city of Adelaide founded in 1836, is named in honour of Adelaide of Saxe-Meiningen, queen consort to King William IV.

Tasmania
Hobart – city named after the English politician Robert Hobart 4th Earl of Buckinghamshire who was British Secretary of State for War and the Colonies in 1804 at the time of its settlement.
Launceston – was named in honour of the New South Wales Governor Captain Philip Gidley King, who was born in Launceston, Cornwall, England.

Victoria
Victoria – like Queensland, was named after Queen Victoria, who had been on the British throne for 14 years when the colony was established in 1851.

 Melbourne – was named in honour of William Lamb, 2nd Viscount Melbourne, Queen Victoria's first Prime Minister, and thus indirectly takes its name from the village of Melbourne, Derbyshire, England.

Western Australia
 Perth – The city is named after Perth, Scotland, by influence of Sir George Murray, then British Secretary of State for War and the Colonies. in Murray's honour.

External territories
  Norfolk Island - Captain James Cook named it after Mary Howard, Duchess of Norfolk (c. 1712 – 1773).

See also 

 Anglo-Celtic
 Cornish Australians
 Demographics of Australia
 English Australians
 European Australians
 Europeans in Oceania
 Irish Australians
 Scottish Australians
 Welsh Australians
 British diaspora
 Anglo-Americans

Notes

References 

+
+
British Australian
European Australian
Irish Australian